Jagga Jasoos is a 2017 Indian Hindi-language musical adventure comedy film written and directed by Anurag Basu, and produced by Siddharth Roy Kapur, Basu and Ranbir Kapoor. It stars Kapoor and Katrina Kaif, and tells the story of a teenage detective in search of his missing father. It was released on 14 July 2017 to mixed reviews from critics, but bagged ten nominations at the 63rd Filmfare Awards, winning four of them for the film's music.

Plot 
The story of Jagga Jasoos revolves around the high-profile case of Purulia Arms Drop, which took place in 1995 allegedly to overthrow the then Communist Government of West Bengal, India. Jagga, a curious and shy young boy in a quaint little town lives a happy life with his accident-prone adoptive father, Badal Bagchi. Jagga, being self-conscious of his stammer, doesn't speak much; until one day Bagchi teaches him to "speak" in song. Sometime later, after admitting Jagga into a boarding school, Bagchi suddenly disappears. Feeling abandoned, Jagga's only contact with Bagchi is a VHS tape that he receives in the mail every year on his birthday. Armed with sharp detective skills, Jagga sets out to solve the mystery of his missing parent. Along the way, he finds a partner in Shruti Sengupta, an accident-prone journalist with her own international criminal case to solve. Using a few tricks he learnt from Bagchi, Jagga, with Shruti, embarks on a mission to uncover details of his father's mysterious secret life and finds himself embroiled in a worldwide smuggling racket. The film later ends on a cliffhanger as it shows Jagga and his father on a cruise ship having been captured by the Two-Headed Bashir Alexander.

Cast 
Ranbir Kapoor as Jagga Bagchi
 Katrina Kaif as Shruti Sengupta
 Saswata Chatterjee as Badal Bagchi, Jagga's guardian whom he calls TutiFuti.
 Kiran Srinivas
 Chitrak Bandyopadhyay as Debu
 Sayani Gupta as Little girl
 Saurabh Shukla as Ex-IB Officer Sinha
 Ivan Rodrigues as Ahuja, Mining Tycoon
 Rajatava Dutta as Inspector Ratikant Palit
 Denzil Smith as a terrorist
 Mir Sarwar as a shooter
 Bijou Thaangjam
 Nawazuddin Siddiqui in a cameo appearance as 2-Headed Bashir Alexander
 Govinda in a deleted cameo appearance
Anurag Basu in a cameo

Production 
Filming took place in Cape Town, South Africa. Reports from Cape Town were that the real-world romance of Kapoor and Kaif was falling apart and occasional arguments between the two caused some delays and resulted in scenes not having the impact intended by Basu. By 20 March 2014, Basu had completed 20 days of filming with his leads and, being unhappy with initial efforts by Kapoor, intended to use the additional schedule time to re-shoot some scenes. Kapoor was simultaneously shooting for Anurag Kashyap's Bombay Velvet and Imtiaz Ali's Tamasha. Basu explained, "We've to shoot Jagga Jasoos during the gaps in the shooting of Bombay Velvet. We completed one schedule. Now we'll go into a lengthy schedule from August. By the end of the year the shooting would be complete."

The film was originally going to release on 27 November 2015, but the film's release date was pushed to April 2017.

Soundtrack 

The film is a musical and has a total of 29 songs which are part of a narrative. Ranbir Kapoor sang most of his dialogues rather than saying them. T-Series released the film soundtrack album.

Release 
The film was released on 14 July 2017 worldwide. A sneak peek of the film was released on 19 December 2016. The movie earned around 331.7 million in its first weekend.

Reception

Box office 
Jagga Jasoos proved to be a box office bomb.

Critical reception 
Jagga Jasoos received mixed reviews from film critics.

India 
Baradwaj Rangan gave a positive review, calling it an "A mad, magical, parts-greater-than-sum musical that's a total treat", concluding his review with "Anurag Basu has made a right-brain movie. I’m not sure it can be defended logically, and I’m not sure I care when the result is so mad, so magical.". Namrata Joshi of The Hindu called the film "A comic book swamped with music", observing that "Basu is aiming at reaching out to the children and the kid in every adult" while also noting the "Broadway musical format" of the film and the "distant, exotic" locations, saying "Jagga Jasoos's fantasy does get fantastic". Tanul Thakur of The Wire, wrote "There's a good film and a solid story somewhere in Jagga Jasoos, but it can be only accessed beneath its layers of indulgence, confusion and ambition." Rohit Vats of Hindustan Times rated the film 3.5/5 and commented, "Ranbir Kapoor never drops one emotion and he is really sincere. He is the shining knight of this story, which demanded its protagonist to not look silly despite being an overgrown adolescent." Nihit Bhave of The Times of India rated the film 3.5/5 and said, "For a film industry that adheres to certain rules of using music, Jagga Jasoos is an undeniable experiment." Rohit Bhatnagar of Deccan Chronicle gave a 3.5/5 rating noting, "The plot is so engaging that you wouldn't even mind a poker-faced Katrina tagging around with Ranbir, who completely steals the show. Only an 'Ullu Ka Pattha' would miss this adventure." Ahana Bhattacharya of Koimoi rated 3.5/5 and commented "A unique and interesting story. Basu pens an intriguing tale of a father-son story. I would highly recommend watching this musical with a fresh and interesting script and nice music. This is surely one of Ranbir's best performances." Raya Ghosh of Times Now rated 3.5/5 and commented "Ranbir's performance is effortless and the entire film rests on his shoulders with adequate support from Saswata Chatterjee for whom brilliant, even, would be an understatement." Sukanya Verma of Rediff.com rated 3.5/5 and said, "Jagga Jasoos  revels in its lavish imagination, meddlesome inquiries and delicious bongness, never once pausing to catch a breath or make sense." Jhinuk Sen of Catch News rated 3.5/5 and said, "All is hunky dory – the on-screen chemistry, some great supporting characters, excellently choreographed action sequences – till the 'un-realism' gets a little hard to swallow, even with the sprinkles of rainbows and optimism."

National Award winning critic Saibal Chatterjee, and Raja Sen, of NDTV India rated 3/5 and 4/5 respectively with reviews, "Jagga Jasoos has memorable madcap moments stemming principally from its free-flowing mix of music, dance, situational and slapstick comedy and wildly improbable action. Even if this film might feel like an epic misfire at times, Anurag Basu's deliciously zany, ambitious adventure drama, when it is on the song, has an oddly bewitching quality." and "Basu has always been a storyteller with excellent imagery, but the way he has embraced the madcap is something else. The detailing is a thing of beauty." Ananya Bhattacharya of India Today rated 3/5 and commented "Jagga and Shruti get their wings in director Anurag Basu's masterpiece, but having said that, Jagga Jasoos is not free from its flaws. It took Basu three years to finish this film. While the details and the hard work are visible in every shot in the film, the story gives in to cliches in the second half." Stutee Ghosh of The Quint rated 3/5 and said "Jagga Jasoos is a poor attempt. It tries its hand at something new and gets it right. But the slow and indulgent pace will ensure that the film isn't everyone's cup of tea." Sameeksha of News18 India rated 3/5 and commented, "A delightful story straight out of an adventurous comic book."

Rachit Gupta of Filmfare rated the film at 2.5/5 and said,"Jagga Jasoos could not have been so much more. But it just feels like a long and winding screenplay that tries to fit in too many foolish and lavish ideas." Madhuri of Filmibeat rated 2.5/5 and said, "The writing exudes joyful abandon and warmth initially. However, it soon starts faltering at places and you do end up losing your attention. Too many subplots dilute the main crux of the film and suddenly you find yourself craving for that warmth that's been missing for a while." Sarita A Tanwar of Daily News & Analysis gave a 2/5 rating and said, "Despite the novel treatment and outstanding aesthetics, this Ranbir Kapoor-Katrina Kaif film's a mistake!" Shubhra Gupta of The Indian Express gave only a 1.5/5 rating and said, "Trouble is, in its zeal to put together novel locations and exotic hot spots, ‘Jagga Jasoos’ forgets to give us a story. The good-looking leads are left to fend for themselves in a sinking plot."

International 
Shilpa Jamkhandikar of Reuters called the film "a rousing musical that pays tribute to Tintin and Feluda, and combines Disney's musical tradition with a whimsical style reminiscent of Wes Anderson's work."
Areebah Shahid writing for Pakistani website, Bolo Jawan rated the film 4.5/5 saying, "Every frame is a visual treat and speaks volumes about the effort put into making Jagga Jasoos the theatrical marvel that it is." She applauds the director and the cast stating, "...with Jagga Jasoos Anurag Basu and his team have created magic on the big screen."

Awards and nominations

See also 

 Fictional detectives
 Feluda
 Tintin
 Byomkesh Bakshi
 Shundi, fictional kingdom featured in the film
 Heer Raanjha, a 1970 Indian film with dialogue in verse/songs
 Jagga Jatt, namesake of the film
 Bobby Jasoos

References

External links 
 
 Jagga Jasoos at D23.com
 Jagga Jasoos at Bollywood Hungama
 
 

2010s Hindi-language films
2010s adventure comedy films
2010s comedy mystery films
2017 romantic comedy films
2017 films
Disney India films
Films about insurgency in Northeast India
Films about Naxalism
Films about arms trafficking
Films about communism
Films about journalists
Films featuring songs by Pritam
Films set in 1995
Films set in Africa
Films set in Kolkata
Films set in West Bengal
Films set in a fictional country
Films shot in Darjeeling
Films shot in Morocco
Films shot in South Africa
Films shot in Thailand
Hindi-language films based on actual events
Indian adventure comedy films
Indian comedy mystery films
Indian detective films
Indian films based on actual events
Indian nonlinear narrative films
Indian romantic comedy films
UTV Motion Pictures films
Films directed by Anurag Basu